was a Japanese confucian scholar, historian, and poet. His real name was Kaoru (馨). His pen name was Chikudō (竹堂) or Bōyōshi (茫洋子).

Life 
Chikudō was born in Mutsukoku-Tōdagun-Numabemura (now Tajiri in Tōda District, Miyagi prefecture). He studied under Ōtsuki Heisen and Masujima Ran-en. Chikudō entered Yushima Seidō where he studied and taught Chinese poetry, and served as the house master in Yushima Seidō. He associated with the celebrities in those days. For example, Ōtsuki Bankei, Hagura Kandō, Saitō Totsudō and Shinozaki Shōchiku. Rai Mikisaburō was Chikudō's junior in Yushima Seidō and a friend of his.

Works 
Chikudō wrote most poems and prose in Classical Chinese. His Chinese sentences did not have ambiguity. His interests were very wide. He knew the history of Western countries and was using Noah, the history of Babylonia, Alexander the Great, Aristotle, Napoleon and George Washington as poem themes.

Bibliography
  - Biography of Date Masamune
  - Biography of Date Aki(伊達安芸),Lord of Wakuya Domain
  - History of Tōhoku region
  - Analysis of Japanese historic persons
 
  - Report of First Opium War
  - History of Western countries

References 

 "頼山陽とその時代" (Rai San'yo and his era)  : Nakamura Shinichirō（中村真一郎） published in 1976
 "涌谷町史"(Wakuya-Chōshi) : History of Wakuya town

1815 births
1852 deaths
Historians of Japan
Japanese writers of the Edo period
Japanese Confucianists
19th-century Japanese poets
19th-century Japanese historians